Shannon Webb-Campbell is Canadian writer, poet and editor. She is descended from Miꞌkmaq people from the Qalipu First Nation in Newfoundland.

Writing career 

In December 2013 Webb-Campbell was chosen to be the 2014 Canadian Women in Literary Arts (CWILA) "critic in residence". As part of her residency, she published interviews and reviews in The National Post, The Telegraph Journal, The Coast and Plenitude Magazine.

Her first book, Still No Word, was published by Breakwater Books in 2015. The collection of poetry explores identity, wounding and healing. The publication of the book was part of the Egale Canada Out in Print Literary Award, which Webb-Campbell had won in 2014. The award provides "financial and publishing support to an emerging queer and/or trans-spectrum, female-identified writer in Canada."

Controversy surrounding Who Took My Sister? 
In 2018, Webb-Campbell published her second collection of poetry titled Who Took my Sister? focusing on themes of missing and murdered Indigenous women. The family of Loretta Saunders, one of the women whose murder Webb-Campbell described in a poem, spoke out against the book and revealed that the poet did not seek their permission prior to publication. It emerged that Webb-Campbell had not spoken to any of the families of those who were depicted in her book. In response Book*hug, her publisher, withdrew the book from sale and halted distribution. In addition, Book*hug donated revenue from the book to the Loretta Saunders Community Scholarship Fund.

Webb-Campbell personally wrote letters of apology to each of the families and, in collaboration with Lee Maracle, reworked the book, eventually publishing it as I Am a Body of Land in 2019. The new book studies the relationship between individual and collective trauma, and bears little resemblance to the withdrawn work. Reviewing the book for Arc Poetry Magazine, Kathy Mac  describes the poet "[grappling] with the collapse of both her social life and her sense of self." She notes that there is a "deliberate awkwardness" reflecting the alienation felt by the poet. Reviewer T. Liem, writing in the Montreal Review of Books, praised Webb-Campbell's use of the "energy of repetition to build layers of meaning." I Am a Body of Land was a finalist for the 2019 Quebec Writers' Federation A.M. Klein Prize for Poetry.

Works

References 

Living people
Year of birth missing (living people)
Mi'kmaq people
Writers from Newfoundland and Labrador
First Nations women writers
21st-century First Nations writers
21st-century Canadian women writers
First Nations poets
Canadian women poets
Canadian LGBT poets
Canadian literary critics
LGBT First Nations people
21st-century Canadian LGBT people